MISA may refer to:

Maintenance of Internal Security Act, an act of Parliament in India
Media Institute of Southern Africa, a media watch-dog organisation across Southern Africa